Demise is the second full-length album by Nachtmystium. It is their final album to feature a straightforward black metal sound.

Track listing

Personnel

Additional personnel
 Christophe Szpajdel — logo

References

External links
 Nachtmystium Website
 Demise on Encyclopaedia Metallum
 Nachtmystium Interview

Nachtmystium albums
2006 albums
Southern Lord Records albums